The Players Club is a 1998 American comedy drama thriller film written and directed by Ice Cube in his feature film directorial debut. In addition to Ice Cube, the film stars Bernie Mac, Monica Calhoun, Jamie Foxx, John Amos, A. J. Johnson, Alex Thomas, Charlie Murphy, Terrence Howard, Faizon Love and LisaRaye McCoy in her first starring role.

Plot
Diana Armstrong gazes at the ruins of the Players Club, a strip club where she used to work. She begins reminiscing about the time she moved out of her parents' home with hopes of attending college. On her own, Diana finds a job at a shoe store, where she meets Ronnie and Tricks, who work for Dollar Bill at the Players Club. They convince Diana she would make better money stripping. Dollar Bill gives Diana a job and the name "Diamond." Four years later, her younger cousin Ebony comes to live with her and also starts working at the club. Ebony is soon out of control, drinking excessively, staying out all night, and stripping at private house parties.

Several scenes depict episodes in the life of the club: A visit from a famous rapper ends in a fistfight. Diamond deals with a stalker. Diamond throws Ebony out of the apartment after catching her sleeping with Diamond's boyfriend.

Dollar Bill is confronted by a man who works for St. Louis, a drug lord and loan shark to whom Dollar Bill owes $60,000. He warns Dollar Bill if he doesn't make a payment of $10,000 to St. Louis, he will hunt him down. The next day as Dollar Bill tries to leave the club, St. Louis' men beat Dollar unconscious and throw him into the trunk of his car. They are stopped by two crooked cops. Dollar Bill is found in the trunk and arrested on warrants. He is later bailed out and returns to the club. 

Ebony is offered a gig to dance at Ronnie's brother Junior's bachelor party. At the party, Junior beats and rapes her, leaving his friends to listen to it in full disgust and disbelief. Soon, Reggie, Clyde and the other guests leave, wanting no further involvement with Junior. When Ronnie discovers Ebony unconscious, she and Junior flee the hotel room as she scolds him. Later, Diamond discovers Ebony bloodied and unconscious on the bed. This proves to be the final straw for Diamond. Furious, Diamond grabs her gun and goes to the Players Club to find Ronnie, where they get into a brutal fistfight, while Blue stands guard at the door. Diamond wins and knocks out Tricks on her way out. Dollar Bill fires Diamond and Blue in retaliation as they leave.

Ronnie and Tricks are arrested by the police. That same night, St. Louis comes to collect and personally shoots up the club. As Dollar tries to escape, he is captured by St. Louis' henchmen. Later, St. Louis' associate Brooklyn destroys the club with a LAW rocket.

Ebony, still sporting the bruises from her rape, now has a job working at the shoe store. Ebony and Diana are back on good terms again. In voice-over, Diamond narrates the fates of the characters.

Cast
 LisaRaye as Diana "Diamond" Armstrong: A college student, single mom and aspiring journalist who gets a job at The Players Club to raise money for her college tuition.
 Bernie Mac as Dollar Bill: the dim crooked owner of The Players Club who is threatened by a loan shark named St. Louis. 
 Monica Calhoun as Ebony Armstrong: Diamond's younger cousin who becomes out-of-control after getting a job at The Players Club.
 A. J. Johnson as Lil' Man: the club's small-sized doorman who is frequently taunted and harmed by St. Louis and his crooks.
 Ice Cube as Reggie: A henchman working for St. Louis.
 Alex Thomas as Clyde: Reggie's best friend who, like Reggie, has a thirst towards Ebony and works for St. Louis.
 Jamie Foxx as Blue: the club's radio disc jockey and Diamond's love interest.
 John Amos as Officer Freeman: a crooked police officer who harasses suspects.
 Oren Williams as Jamal Armstrong: Diamond's 4 year old son.
 Chrystale Wilson as Ronnie: A stripper at The Players Club with a rivalry with Diamond and Ebony.
 Adele Givens as Tricks: A stripper at The Players Club and a right-hand of Ronnie.
 Tiny Lister as XL the Bouncer: a tall, muscular bouncer of the club.
 Larry McCoy as St. Louis: a wheelchair-using gangster to whom Dollar Bill owes money.
 Badja Djola as The Doctor: St. Louis' enforcer.
 Charlie Murphy as Brooklyn: St. Louis' main henchman.
 Terrence Howard as K.C.: St. Louis' secondary henchman and Brooklyn's partner in crime.
 Faizon Love as Officer Peters: another police officer who harasses suspects.
 Samuel Monroe Jr. as Junior: Ronnie's younger brother who beats and rapes Ebony in the film's climax.
 Luther Campbell as Luke: a rapper who visits the club.
 Michael Clarke Duncan as Bodyguard: the tall, muscular bodyguard for Luke.
 Montae Russell as Lance: Diamond's boyfriend whom she ended her relationship with after he had sex with Ebony.

Soundtrack

A successful soundtrack was released on March 17, 1998, It peaked at #10 on the Billboard 200 and #2 on the Top R&B/Hip-Hop Albums.

Reception

Box office
The movie debuted at No. 5. It went on to gross $23,047,939 domestically, and $213,546 in foreign markets for a total lifetime gross of $23,261,485.

Critical response
On Rotten Tomatoes, the film has an approval rating of 31%, based on 16 reviews, with an average rating of 5.20/10.

References

External links

1998 films
1998 comedy-drama films
American black comedy films
Hood films
Films directed by Ice Cube
Films produced by Ice Cube
Films with screenplays by Ice Cube
1990s black comedy films
American comedy-drama films
Films about striptease
African-American films
American drama films
Films set in Atlanta
New Line Cinema films
1998 directorial debut films
Films about rape
1990s English-language films
1990s American films